Cuarto is Spanish for "room" and "fourth", and may refer to:

 , a room
 Cuarto (Ponce), a barrio of the municipality of Ponce, Puerto Rico
 Cuarto River (sometimes even Río Cuarto River, even though río means "river"), a river in Argentina that gave its name to:
 Río Cuarto, Córdoba
 Río Cuarto craters, Argentina
 Cuarto milenio, a TV program on the TV channel Cuatro
 , an obsolete Spanish coin

See also

 Quarto (disambiguation)
 Cuatro (disambiguation)
 Quatro (disambiguation)
Quattro (disambiguation)